Galang is a Filipino surname meaning "respect" in Tagalog. Notable people with the surname include:

 Rey Galang, Filipino martial arts teacher and author
 Zoilito Galang (1895–1959), Filipino author

Tagalog-language surnames